Lay Hana (also Romanized as Lāy Ḩanā; also known as Lā-ye Hanā and Lāy Janā) is a village in Rostaq Rural District, in the Central District of Neyriz County, Fars Province, Iran. At the 2006 census, its population was 98, in 28 families.

References 

Populated places in Neyriz County